Liezel Huber and Bob Bryan were the defending champions, but Bryan chose to not compete this year in mixed doubles.

Huber partnered up with Mahesh Bhupathi, but they lost in the first round against Chan Yung-jan and Eric Butorac.

Katarina Srebotnik and Nenad Zimonjić won in the final 4–6, 7–6(7–5), [11–9], against Yaroslava Shvedova and Julian Knowle.

Seeds

Draw

Finals

Top half

Bottom half

External links
 Main draw
2010 French Open – Doubles draws and results at the International Tennis Federation

Mixed Doubles
French Open by year – Mixed doubles